Ammalo is a genus of moths in the subtribe Phaegopterina in the family Erebidae. The genus was erected by Francis Walker in 1855.

Species
Ammalo ammaloides (Rothschild, 1909) Peru, Brazil (Amazonas)
Ammalo buritiensis Rego Barros, 1974 Brazil (Mato Grosso)
Ammalo helops (Cramer, [1775]) Mexico, Guatemala, Costa Rica, Honduras, Panama, Jamaica, Cuba, Hait, Granada, Tridinad, Amazonas, Brazil, Venezuela, Surinam, Peru, Colombia
Ammalo klagesi Rothschild, 1909 Brazil (Amazonas), French Guiana
Ammalo pachycera (Seitz, 1922) Bolivia
Ammalo peruviana Rothschild, 1922 Peru
Ammalo ramsdeni Schaus, 1924 Cuba
Ammalo travassosi Rego Barros, 1974 Brazil (Rio de Janeiro)
Ammalo trujillaria Dognin, 1905 Peru
Ammalo violitincta Rothschild, 1922 Brazil (Pará)

References

Phaegopterina
Moth genera